Otse Hill is a peak often cited as the highest point of Botswana, with a reported altitude of 1,491 metres (4,891 feet). It is located in the village of Otse, South-East District.  Its highest cell on SRTM data is 1,486 meters - 4875 feet.  The 1999 Department of Surveys and Mapping (Gaborone) 1:50,000 scale topographic map shows a "trigonometrical station" on the Otse Peak summit with an elevation of 1,491 meters - 4892 feet.

The Monalanong Hill (at a SRTM-derived altitude of 1,494 metres - 4,902 feet) or the Tsodilo Hills (at an altitude of about 1400 metres - 4,593 feet) are also often given as the highest point in Botswana.

Notes

See also
 Geography of Botswana

Otse Hill
Highest points of countries